Gattaca is a 1997 American dystopian science fiction thriller film written and directed by Andrew Niccol in his directorial debut. It stars Ethan Hawke and Uma Thurman with Jude Law, Loren Dean, Ernest Borgnine, Gore Vidal, and Alan Arkin appearing in supporting roles. The film presents a biopunk vision of a future society driven by eugenics where potential children are conceived through genetic selection to ensure they possess the best hereditary traits of their parents. The film centers on Vincent Freeman, played by Hawke, who was conceived outside the eugenics program and struggles to overcome genetic discrimination to realize his dream of going into space.

The film draws on concerns over reproductive technologies that facilitate eugenics, and the possible consequences of such technological developments for society. It also explores the idea of destiny and the ways in which it can and does govern lives. Characters in Gattaca continually battle both with society and with themselves to find their place in the world and who they are destined to be according to their genes.

The film's title is based on the letters G, A, T, and C, which stand for guanine, adenine, thymine, and cytosine, the four nucleobases of DNA. It was a 1997 nominee for the Academy Award for Best Art Direction and the Golden Globe Award for Best Original Score. A follow-up series is in development at Showtime.

Plot
In the "not-too-distant" future, eugenics is common. A genetic registry database uses biometrics to classify those so created as "valids" while those conceived naturally and more susceptible to genetic disorders are known as "in-valids". Genetic discrimination is illegal, but in practice genotype profiling is used to identify valids to qualify for professional employment while in-valids are relegated to menial jobs.

Vincent Freeman was conceived naturally, and his genetic profile indicates a high probability of several disorders and an estimated lifespan of 30.2 years. His parents, regretting their decision, use genetic selection in conceiving their second child, Anton Jr. Growing up, the two brothers often play a game of "chicken" by swimming out to sea as far as possible, with the first one returning to shore considered the loser; Vincent always loses. Vincent dreams of a career in space travel but is always reminded of his genetic inferiority. One day, Vincent challenges Anton to a game of chicken and beats him. Anton starts to drown and is saved by Vincent. Shortly after, Vincent leaves home.

Years later, Vincent works cleaning office spaces, including that of spaceflight conglomerate Gattaca Aerospace Corporation. He gets a chance to pose as a valid by using donated hair, skin, blood, and urine samples from former swimming star Jerome Eugene Morrow, who was paralyzed after being hit by a car. With Jerome's genetic makeup, Vincent gains employment at Gattaca and is assigned as a navigator for an upcoming mission to Saturn's moon Titan. To conceal his identity, Vincent must meticulously groom and scrub down daily to remove his own genetic material, pass daily DNA scanning and urine tests using Jerome's samples, and hide his heart defect.

When a Gattaca administrator is murdered a week before a possible launch, the police find one of Vincent's eyelashes near the crime scene but can only identify it as from an "unregistered" in-valid, and thus launch an investigation to find who owns the eyelash. During this, Vincent becomes close to a co-worker, Irene Cassini, and falls in love with her. Though a valid, Irene has a higher risk of heart failure that will bar her from any deep space mission. Vincent also learns that Jerome's paralysis is self-inflicted; after placing silver in the Olympics, Jerome threw himself in front of a car. Jerome maintains that he was designed to be the best, yet somehow wasn't, and is suffering because of this.

Vincent repeatedly evades the grasp of the investigation. Finally, it is revealed that Gattaca's mission director Josef killed the administrator because he threatened to cancel the mission. Vincent learns that the detective who closed the case was his brother Anton, who consequently has discovered Vincent's presence. The brothers meet, and Anton warns Vincent about his illegal actions, but Vincent asserts that he has gotten to this position on his own merits. Anton challenges Vincent to a final game of chicken. As the two swim out at night, Vincent's stamina surprises Anton, so Vincent reveals that he won by not saving energy for the swim back. Anton turns back and begins to drown, but Vincent rescues him and swims them back to shore.

On the day of the launch, Jerome reveals that he has stored enough DNA samples for Vincent to last two lifetimes upon his return and gives him an envelope to open once in flight. After saying goodbye to Irene, Vincent prepares to board but discovers there is a final genetic test, and he currently lacks any of Jerome's samples. He is surprised when Dr. Lamar, who oversees background checks, reveals that he knows Vincent has been posing as a valid. Lamar admits that his son looks up to Vincent and wonders whether his son, genetically selected but "not all that they promised", could exceed his potential just as Vincent has. The doctor changes the test results, allowing Vincent to pass. 

As the rocket launches, Jerome dons his swimming medal and immolates himself in his home's incinerator. Vincent opens the note to find a lock of Jerome's hair.

Cast

 Ethan Hawke as Vincent Freeman, impersonating Jerome Eugene Morrow
 Mason Gamble as young Vincent
 Chad Christ as teenage Vincent
 Uma Thurman as Irene Cassini
 Jude Law as Jerome Eugene Morrow
 Loren Dean as Anton Freeman
 Vincent Nielson as young Anton
 William Lee Scott as teenage Anton
 Gore Vidal as Director Josef
 Xander Berkeley as Dr. Lamar
 Jayne Brook as Marie Freeman
 Elias Koteas as Antonio Freeman
 Maya Rudolph as delivery nurse
 Blair Underwood as geneticist
 Ernest Borgnine as Caesar
 Tony Shalhoub as German
 Alan Arkin as Detective Hugo
 Dean Norris as cop on the beat
 Ken Marino as sequencing technician
 Cynthia Martells as Cavendish
 Gabrielle Reece as Gattaca trainer

Production

The film was shot under the working title The Eighth Day, a reference to the seven days of creation in the Bible. However, by the time its release was scheduled for the fall of 1997, the Belgian film  had already been released in the US under the title The Eighth Day. As a result, the film was retitled Gattaca.

Filming
The exteriors (including the roof scene) and some of the interior shots of the Gattaca complex were filmed at Frank Lloyd Wright's 1960 Marin County Civic Center in San Rafael, California. The speakers in the complex broadcast announcements both in Esperanto and English; Miko Sloper from the Esperanto League of North America went to the recording studio to handle the Esperanto part. The parking lot scenes were shot at the Otis College of Art and Design, distinguished by its punch card-like windows, located near Los Angeles International Airport. The exterior of Vincent Freeman's house was shot at the CLA Building on the campus of California State Polytechnic University, Pomona. Other exterior shots were filmed at the bottom of the spillway of the Sepulveda Dam, Culver City High School, and outside The Forum in Inglewood. The solar power plant mirrors sequence was filmed at the Kramer Junction Solar Electric Generating Station.

The film is noted for its unique use of color. Cinematographer Slawomir Idziak employed vibrant gold, green, and electric blue tones throughout the film, and shot the film in Super 35mm format, which adds an enlarged layer of grain.

Design
The movie uses a swimming treadmill in the opening minutes to punctuate the swimming and futuristic themes. The production design makes heavy use of retrofuturism; the futuristic electric cars are based on 1960s car models like Rover P6, Citroën DS19 and Studebaker Avanti.

Title sequence 
The opening title sequence, created by Michael Riley, features closeups of body matter (fingernails and hair), which are later revealed to be from Vincent's daily bodily scourings, hitting the floor accompanied by loud sounds as the objects strike the ground. According to Riley, oversized models of the fingernails and hair were created for the effect.

Music and soundtrack

The score for Gattaca was composed by Michael Nyman, and the original soundtrack was released on October 21, 1997.

Release

Box office
Gattaca was released in theaters on October 24, 1997 in the United States by Columbia Pictures and opened at number 5 at the box office; trailing I Know What You Did Last Summer, The Devil's Advocate, Kiss the Girls and Seven Years in Tibet. Over the first weekend the film brought in $4.3 million. It ended its theatrical run with a domestic total of $12.5 million against a reported production budget of $36 million.

Home media
Gattaca was released on DVD on July 1, 1998, and was also released on Superbit DVD. Special Edition DVD and Blu-ray versions were released on March 11, 2008. Both editions contain a deleted scene featuring historical figures like Einstein, Lincoln, etc., who are described as having been genetically deficient.

Gattaca was released on Ultra HD Blu-ray in 2021.

Reception

Critical response
Gattaca received positive reviews from critics. On review aggregator Rotten Tomatoes the film received an approval rating of 82% based on 66 reviews, with a rating average of 7.1/10. The site's critical consensus states that "Intelligent and scientifically provocative, Gattaca is an absorbing sci-fi drama that poses important interesting ethical questions about the nature of science." On Metacritic, the film received "generally favorable reviews" with a score of 64 out of 100, based on 20 reviews. Roger Ebert stated, "This is one of the smartest and most provocative of science fiction films, a thriller with ideas." James Berardinelli praised it for "energy and tautness" and its "thought-provoking script and thematic richness."

Although critically acclaimed, Gattaca was not a box office success, but it is said to have crystallized the debate over the controversial topic of human genetic engineering. The film's dystopian depiction of "genoism" has been cited by many bioethicists and laypeople in support of their hesitancy about, or opposition to, eugenics and the societal acceptance of the genetic-determinist ideology that may frame it. In a 1997 review of the film for the journal Nature Genetics, molecular biologist Lee M. Silver stated that "Gattaca is a film that all geneticists should see if for no other reason than to understand the perception of our trade held by so many of the public-at-large".

Accolades

Continuation
On October 30, 2009, Variety reported that Sony Pictures Television was developing a television adaptation of the feature film as a one-hour police procedural set in the future. The show was to be written by Gil Grant, who has written for 24 and NCIS. A Gattaca television series was revealed to be in development at Sony and Showtime in March 2023, intended to take place one generation after the events of the film. Howard Gordon and Alex Gansa were tapped as showrunners, and were also expected to serve as screenwriters alongside Craig Borten. Gordon, Gansa, Glenn Gellar, and DeVito (who produced the film) will serve as executive producers.

Legacy

Influence on In Time
Writer-director Andrew Niccol has called his 2011 film In Time a "bastard child of Gattaca". Both films feature classic cars in a futuristic dystopia as well as a caste privilege schism which the protagonist challenges and which prejudices the authorities into neglecting a thorough investigation in favor of condemning the protagonist.

Political references
U.S. Senator Rand Paul used near-verbatim portions of the plot summary from the English Wikipedia entry on Gattaca in a speech at Liberty University on October 28, 2013 in support of Virginia Attorney General Ken Cuccinelli's campaign for Governor of Virginia. Paul said that abortion rights advocates are advancing eugenics in a manner similar to the events in Gattaca.

Transhumanism

In the 2004 democratic transhumanist book Citizen Cyborg, bioethicist James Hughes criticized the premise and influence of the film as fear-mongering, arguing:
 Astronaut-training programs are entirely justified in attempting to screen out people with heart problems for safety reasons;
 In the United States, people are already screened by insurance companies on the basis of their propensities to disease, for actuarial purposes;
 Rather than banning genetic testing or genetic enhancement, society should develop genetic information privacy laws such as the U.S. Genetic Information Nondiscrimination Act signed into law on May 21, 2008 that allow justified forms of genetic testing and data aggregation, but forbid those that are judged to result in genetic discrimination. Citizens should then be able to make a complaint to the appropriate authority if they believe they have been discriminated against because of their genotype.

See also
 List of films featuring surveillance
 Gattaca argument
 Transhumanism § Genetic divide
 Germinal choice technology

References

Further reading
 
 Interview with Dr. Paul Durham, Director of Cell Biology and the Center for Biomedical and Life Sciences at Missouri State University, about Gattaca.

External links

 
 
 
 
 
 
 Gattaca Screenplay
 Genetic Determinism in Gattaca

1990s science fiction drama films
1990s dystopian films
American science fiction drama films
1990s English-language films
Biopunk films
Columbia Pictures films
American dystopian films
Eugenics in fiction
Films about paraplegics or quadriplegics
Films about security and surveillance
Films directed by Andrew Niccol
Films produced by Danny DeVito
Films set in the future
Films about genetic engineering
Hard science fiction films
Titan (moon) in film
Films scored by Michael Nyman
1997 directorial debut films
1997 drama films
1997 science fiction films
1997 films
Films about discrimination
1990s American films
Films about disability
Films with screenplays by Andrew Niccol